"Everything Is Average Nowadays" is a song by English rock band Kaiser Chiefs and is the ninth track on their second album, Yours Truly, Angry Mob. The song was released as the second single from that album in the United Kingdom on 21 May 2007 (see 2007 in British music).

A live version of the song recorded in Berlin during the band's tour there in November 2006 was released in the United States on 13 March 2007 as part of a promotional disc offered at Best Buy stores. It has been noted by some fans that the version included on the promo CD is actually the studio version, rather than the live version as stated on the card sleeve.

Both the CD and 7" formats of the single were issued at a limited run, and was deleted one week after its release.

The song has been covered by The Little Ones, which is available on a 7" single with the Kaiser Chiefs' "Love's Not a Competition (But I'm Winning)".

Track listing 
 7" BUN125-7
 "Everything Is Average Nowadays"
 "I Like to Fight"
 This song can also be found as a bonus track on the Japanese edition of "Yours Truly, Angry Mob" and the edition offered at American Best Buy stores.
 CD BUN125CD
 "Everything Is Average Nowadays"
 "Out of My Depth"

Charts

References

External links
"Everything is Average Nowadays" e-card
 "Kaiser Chiefs - Everything Is Average Nowadays" on Youtube

Kaiser Chiefs songs
2006 songs
2007 singles
Song recordings produced by Stephen Street
Songs written by Nick Hodgson
Songs written by Ricky Wilson (British musician)
Songs written by Simon Rix
Songs written by Andrew White (musician)
Songs written by Nick "Peanut" Baines